The Kingdom of Love is a 1917 American silent drama film directed by Frank Lloyd and starring Jewel Carmen, Nancy Caswell and Genevieve Blinn.

Cast
 Jewel Carmen as Violet Carson 
 Nancy Caswell as Violet Carson as a Child 
 Genevieve Blinn as Mrs. Agnes Carson 
 Lee Shumway as Rev. David Cromwell 
 Fred Milton as Frank Carson 
 Joseph Manning as Henry Carson 
 G. Raymond Nye as Caribou Bill 
 Murdock MacQuarrie as Buck, Dance Hall Owner

References

Bibliography
 Solomon, Aubrey. The Fox Film Corporation, 1915-1935: A History and Filmography. McFarland, 2011.

External links

1917 films
1917 drama films
Silent American drama films
Films directed by Frank Lloyd
American silent feature films
1910s English-language films
Fox Film films
American black-and-white films
1910s American films